The corrido (Spanish pronunciation: [koˈrið̞o]) is a popular narrative metrical tale and poetry that forms a ballad. Songs are often about oppression, history, daily life for criminals, the vaquero lifestyle, and other socially relevant topics.[1] Corridos were widely popular during the Mexican Revolution and in the Southwestern American frontier as it was also a part of the development of Tejano music and New Mexico music, which later influenced Western music. The corrido derives largely from the romance, and in its most known form consists of a salutation from the singer and a prologue to the story, the story itself, and a moral and farewell from the singer. It is still a popular genre today in Mexico.

Outside Mexico, corridos are popular in Chilean national celebrations of Fiestas Patrias.[2][3]

History 
An example of a corrido song sheet or sheet music, this one from 1915 at the height of the Mexican Revolution.

Corridos play an important part in Mexican and Mexican American culture. The name comes from the Spanish word correr ("to run"). The formula of a standard corrido is eight quatrains that have four to six lines that contain eight syllables.[4] Corridos have a long history in Mexico, starting from the Mexican War of Independence in 1810 and throughout the Mexican Revolution.[5] Until the arrival and success of electronic mass media (mid-20th century), the corrido served in Mexico as the main informational and educational outlet, even with subversive purposes, due to an apparent linguistic and musical simplicity that lent itself to oral transmission. After the spread of radio and television, the genre evolved into a new stage and is still in the process of maturation. Some scholars, however, consider the corrido to be dead or moribund in more recent times (see e.g. Vicente T. Mendoza, El corrido mexicano, 1954). In more rural areas where Spanish and Mexican cultures have been preserved because of isolation, the romance has taken on other forms related to the corridor as well. In New Mexico, for example, a story-song emerged during the colonial period that was known as an Indita, which loosely follows the format of a corrido, but is chanted rather than sung, similar to a Native American chant, hence the name Indita.

The earliest living specimens of corrido are adapted versions of Spanish romances or European tales, mainly about disgraced or idealized love, or religious topics. These, which include (among others) "La Martina" (an adaptation of the romance "La Esposa Infiel") and "La Delgadina", show the same basic stylistic features of the later mainstream corridos (1/2 or 3/4 tempo and verso menor lyric composing, meaning verses of eight or less phonetic syllables, grouped in strophes of six or fewer verses).

Beginning with the Mexican War of Independence (1810–1821) and culminating during the Mexican Revolution (1910–1921), the genre flourished and acquired its "epic" tones, along with the three-step narrative structure as described above.

A contemporary corrido song sheet of La Cucaracha issued during the Mexican Revolution. Note the original lyrics and the reference to cartoneros, which were a type of scrip issued as pay.

Some corridos may be love stories. These are not exclusively male by any means, there are also corridos about women such as La Venganza de Maria, Laurita Garza, El Corrido de Rosita Alvirez and La Adelita, or couples such as La Fama de la Pareja sung by Los Tigres del Norte. Some even employ fictional stories invented by their composers.

Before the widespread use of radio, popular corridos were passed around as an oral tradition, often to spread the news of events (for example, La cárcel de Cananea) and popular heroes and humour to the population, many of whom were illiterate before the post-Revolution improvements to the educational system. The academic study of corridos written during the Revolution shows that they were used as a means to communicate news throughout Mexico as a response to the propaganda being spread in the newspapers which were owned by the corrupt government of Porfirio Díaz. Sheet music of popular corridos was sold or included in publications. Other corrido sheets were passed out free as a form of propaganda, to eulogize leaders, armies, and political movements, or in some cases to mock the opposition. The best-known Revolutionary corrido is La Cucaracha, an old song that was rephrased to celebrate the exploits of Pancho Villa's army and poke fun at his nemesis Victoriano Huerta.

With the consolidation of "Presidencialismo" (the political era following the Mexican Revolution) and the success of electronic mass media, the corrido lost its primacy as a mass communication form, becoming part of a folklorist cult in one branch and, in another, the voice of the new subversives: oppressed workers, drug growers or traffickers, leftist activists and emigrated farmworkers (mainly to the United States). This is what scholars designate as the "decaying" stage of the genre, which tends to erase the stylistic or structural characteristics of "revolutionary" or traditional corrido without a clear and unified understanding of its evolution. This is mainly signified by the "narcocorrido", many of which are egocentric ballads paid for by drug smugglers to anonymous and almost illiterate composers (more about this assertion here l [dead link]), but with others coming from the most popular norteño and banda artists and written by some of the most successful and influential ranchera composers.

1. La Cucaracha (chorus only)

Performed by Sean Buss & Elisa

Problems playing this file? See media help.

Songs about the battle of Ciudad Juarez titled Toma de Ciudad Juárez

In the Mestizo-Mexican cultural area, the three variants of corrido (romance, revolutionary and modern) are both alive and sung, along with popular sister narrative genres, such as the "value" of Michoacán state, the "son arribeño" of the Sierra Gorda (Guanajuato, Hidalgo and Querétaro states) and others. Its vitality and flexibility allow original corrido lyrics to be built on non-Mexican musical genres, such as blues and ska, or with non-Spanish lyrics, like the famous song El Paso by Marty Robbins, and corridos composed or translated by Mexican indigenous communities or by the "Chicano" people in the United States, in English or "Spanglish". The corrido was, for example, a favourite device employed by the Teatro Campesino led by Luis Valdez in mobilizing largely Mexican and Mexican-American farmworkers in California during the 1960s.

Corridos have seen a renaissance in the 21st century. Contemporary corridos feature contemporary themes such as drug trafficking (narcocorridos), immigration, migrant labour and even the Chupacabra.[6]

Subcategories

Narcocorridos 

Main article: Narcocorrido

Modern artists have created a modern twist to the historical corridos. This new type of corridos is called narcocorridos (literally "drug ballads").[7] The earliest form of corridos emerged in the Mexican Revolution and told stories of revolutionary leaders and battles. Narcocorridos typically use real dates and places to tell mainly stories of drug smuggling but also include violence, murder, poverty, corruption, and crime.[8]

The border zone of Rio Grande has been credited with being the birthplace of narcocorridos. This began in the 1960s with the fast growth of drug empires in the border states of Mexico and the United States.[9] As drug lords grew in influence, people idolized them and began to show their respect and admiration through narcocorridos.[9]

There are two main types of narcocorridos: commercial corridos and private corridos. Commercial narcocorridos are recorded made by famous artists who idolize a certain drug dealer and release a song about him, while private narcocorridos are usually commissioned by the drug dealer himself.[10] While commercial corridos are available to the public, private narcocorridos are restricted to nightclubs that are frequently attended by drug dealers, or through CDs bought on the street. Drug lords often pay singers to write songs about them, as a way to send a message to rivals. These songs are found to be most popular on YouTube, many that have a banner "Approved by the cartel". These types of corridos are changing from the formula historic and typical corridos would usually take. A first-person voice is now being sung instead of the historic third-person point of view.[11]

The Mexican government has tried to ban narcocorridos because of their explicit and controversial lyrics. Most of the Mexican public argues that crimes and violence are to blame for narcocorridos.[12] However, despite the efforts of the Mexican government to ban narcocorridos, the northern states of Mexico can still get access to these songs through US radio stations whose signal still reaches the northern states of Mexico. Narcocorridos are also widely available on websites like Youtube and iHeartRadio. Today, narcocorridos are popular in other Latin American countries like Bolivia, Colombia, Peru, Guatemala and Honduras.[13]

Narcocorridos have been growing in popularity in the United States and they have been targeted at the American public. More recent narcocorridos are even targeted toward the American public and some are even written in English. Like many artists, narcocorrido singers have chosen American cities to perform concerts because the American public can buy concert tickets for a higher price than the average Mexican citizen.[14]

Trapcorridos 
"Trapcorridos" is a Southern California corrido ballad influenced by hip-hop.[15]

Story of Gregorio Cortez 

This section may require copy editing. (December 2022) (Learn how and when to remove this template message)

Gregorio Cortez was a Mexican man born on a ranch near Matamoros, Mexico in 1875, as the "seventh child to a family of eight."[16] However, Gregorio, his parents, and his eight siblings moved to Manor, Texas in 1887. In 1889, Gregorio joined his older brother, Ronaldo, in Karnes county, near Gonzales, Texas. They both worked for farmers as ranch hands and farmhands. They even worked as vaqueros. in 1900, Gregorio and Romaldo went to settle down and married. They were "inseparable".

Then, on June 12, 1901, The Sheriff of El Carmen, W.T. Morris, came to Gregorio and Román to investigate a horse theft. Even though Gregorio and Román were innocent, they spoke Spanish, and the sheriff didn't. Sheriff Morris relied on poor Spanish translations from his fellow Texas Rangers. Cortez and Romaldo got confused and played along. The Sheriff was looking for a horse thief and asked if they traded a horse. Gregorio said "no", and told the sheriff that he had a mare.[17] After a while, Sheriff Morris assumed Gregorio and Romaldo were lying and decided to place them both under arrest, for a crime they didn't commit.

However, when the sheriff tried to arrest the brothers, Gregorio stood up to him, saying "You can't arrest me for nothing". The Sheriff didn't understand his Spanish, and thought he said "No white man can arrest me". The Sherriff got out his pistol and shoot Ronaldo, who ended up wounded. Gregorio shot the sheriff in retaliation. However, Gregorio left the scene and headed straight towards the Austin-Gonzales vicinity.[18] Cortez did a powerful walk to save his life.

Gregorio walked eighty miles a day through difficult terrain just to get to the border. All the while, Texas Rangers were following him. Gregorio even killed the Gonzales sheriff Robert M. Glover, who was leading the charge. Gregorio walked 100 miles to meet a friend named Ceferino Flores, who gave him a saddle. Gregorio eventually got a horse to ride 400 miles to the border. Eventually, Texas Governor Joseph D Sayers and Karnes citizens offered a reward of one thousand dollars for Gregorio's capture. Gregorio eventually landed at the Abran de la Garza sheep camp on June 22, 1901. He started to talk with a man named Jesús González. González, however, led the rangers to find Cortez, and the rangers arrested him.[19] Many Tejanos would brand Jesús González as a traitor, and he would eventually be known as "EL Teco".[20]

Gregorio Cortez was put on trial. A formal letter written and signed by Mexicans of Mexico City, and the president of Mexico, who in turn gave him money to help fund his claim. Sadly, Gregorio was sentenced to life imprisonment for the killings of two sheriffs, and the supposed theft of a horse. However, he got an early release after a year. This verdict was a "victory" for Mexican Americans, and the unfair treatment of Mexican Americans. His name became immortalized, and his story became a corrido, where Cortez was portrayed as a hero.

Ballad of Gregorio Cortez and the Impact 

This section may require copy editing. (December 2022) (Learn how and when to remove this template message)

The Ballad of Gregorio Cortez is a corrido that is well known by Mexican Americans who live near the Rio Grande border between the United States and Mexico. It tells the story of a Mexican Man named Gregorio Cortez who takes up a pistol to defend his individual rights against 33 Texas Rangers from June 12 to June 22, 1901.

The story of Gregorio Cortez was made into a corrido, and he would become a folk hero among people on the Texas-Mexico Border.

Cortez, a Mexican man with a kind heart and a diligent work ethic, was described as "a man who never raised his voice to parent or elder brother, and never disobeyed."[21] Most of the story is no different from his real life, but the story calls him as a sharpshooter, and his brother Romaldo was renamed Román.

Sherrif Morris still had Román and Gregorio question about the horses. But instead of Romaldo being wounded, his counterpart Román, was shot dead trying to protect this brother and collapsed on the ground. However, Gregorio got a gun and shot the sheriff in order to avenge his brother. The story fantasizes Gregorio as being an able bodied man who ran across the country with the Texas Rangers on his tail. The story tells that Gregorio walked 100 miles and rode more than 400 miles. Gregorio walked and walked until he reached the Rio Grande. However, as Gregorio arrived in Goliad, Texas, he met with his friend named "El Teco". However, El Teco betrayed him and turned him in to the police. The Police arrested Gregorio, put him on trial, and Gregorio was sentenced to prison for horse theft, despite never stealing a horse. Gregorio was sentenced for "ninety-nine years and a day" in federal prison.[22]

The story of Gregorio Cortez is a testament to the culture of Mexican-Americans who live in the southwest United States and of Mexican American Culture in general. Gregorio's tale was later made into a corrido and was passed on from person to person. Gregorio Cortez ended up becoming a folk hero. It helped inspire tales of heroism and told the "spirit of the border strife." Many people called Gregorio Cortez a hero because both stories of his real life and the corrido involve him ronning away from the "rinches", or Texas rangers, and he kept evading them until his capture. This gave Mexican-Americans the idea of a Hispanic hero who defended his rights from the American "outsiders".[23]

Both the story and the corrido tell of how Gregorio Cortez was strong because he ended up standing up against a legal system that didn't favor Mexican-Americans, and he became a hero to various people of Mexican descent in Texas.[24]

The corrido has been adapted to other media as well. In 1958, Américo Paredes wrote the book "With his pistol in his hand: a border ballad and its hero". This book details the corrido and the story of Gregorio Cortes in expressive detail and has become a "classic of Mexican-American prose." In 1982, A film titled "The Ballad of Gregorio Cortez" was created and had Edward James Olmos star as Gregorio Cortez. Overall, the story of Gregorio Cortez and the corridos that were inspired by it are a timeless tradition for Mexican-Americans everywhere.[25]

Form 
Corridos, like rancheras, have introductory instrumental music and adornos (ornamentations) accommodating the stanzas of the lyrics. Like rancheras, corridos can be played in virtually all regional Mexican styles. Also like rancheras, corridos are usually played in polka, waltz, or mazurka mode.

Films
2006 - Al Otro Lado (To the Other Side).  Directed by Natalia Almada.
2007 - El Violin (The Violin) directed by Francisco Vargas
2008 - El chrysler 300: Chuy y Mauricio Directed by Enrique Murillo
2009 - El Katch (The Katch) Directed by Oscar Lopez

See also
Norteño
Tambora Sinaloense
Duranguense
Ranchera
Narcocorrido

References

Further reading
Americo Paredes. With His Pistol in His Hand: A Border Ballad and its Hero (Austin: University of Texas Press, 1958)
Richard Flores.  "The Corrido and the Emergence of Texas-Mexican Social Identity" (Journal of American Folklore, Vol. 105, Spring 1992)
Dan Dickey.  The Kennedy Corridos: A Study of the Ballads of a Mexican American Hero (Center for Mexican-American Studies, University of Texas at Austin, 1978)
Merle Simmons. The Mexican Corrido as a Source of an Interpretive Study of Modern Mexico, 1870–1950'' (Bloomington: Indiana University Press, 1957).
Draft.

External links
 Cantar a los narcos https://www.amazon.com/Cantar-narcos-Sing-Dealers-Spanish/dp/6070707206
 Narcocorrido, includes a variety of information about the contemporary scene, including a page of topical corrido lyrics and one on the censorship of corridos in Mexico.
 The Genesis and Development of the Mexican Corrido with complementary information and a research proposal. 
 Corridos performed by folklorist Dr. Americo Paredes from the Texas - Mexico border.
 Summary of the corrido for the Handbook of Texas Online.
 Corridos Sin Fronteras - Ballads Without Borders - This bilingual web site teaches the history of Mexico through corridos.
 The Mexican corrido A short overview with archive photos, audio samples and translations (also in Spanish.)
Mexico: Trouble in Culiacán, Pulitzer Center on Crisis Reporting

Mexican music
Latin music genres
Mexican styles of music
Regional styles of Mexican music
19th-century music genres
20th-century music genres
21st-century music genres